Kübassaar Landscape Conservation Area is a nature park in  Saare County, Estonia.

Its area is 517 ha.

The protected area was founded in 1973 to protect Kübassaare broadleaved forest and its surrounding areas. In 2005, the protected area was designated to the landscape conservation area.

References

Nature reserves in Estonia
Geography of Saare County